Coração de Estudante (English: Student's Heart) is a Brazilian telenovela produced and broadcast by TV Globo in 2002.

Cast 
 Fábio Assunção as Edu (Eduardo Feitosa) 
 Helena Ranaldi as Clara Gouveia Feitosa
 Adriana Esteves as Amelinha (Amélia Mourão)
 Vladimir Brichta as Nélio Garcia
 Cláudio Marzo as João Alfredo Mourão
 Carolina Kasting as Mariana Mendes
 Marcello Antony as Leandro Junqueira
 Ângela Vieira as Esmeralda Camargo
 Bruno Garcia as Pedro Guerra
 Marcos Caruso as Raul Gouveia
 Pedro Malta as Lipe (Felipe Mendes Feitosa)
 Júlia Feldens as Rafaela Tavares
 Alinne Moraes as Rosana
 Jussara Freire as Lígia Gouveia
 Jéssica Marina as Sofia Mourão
 Caio Blat as Matheus Camargo
 Paulo Vilhena as Fábio
 Cláudio Heinrich as Baú (Gustavo Brandão)
 Paulo Gorgulho as Caio
 Rodrigo Prado as Carlos
 Betito Tavares as Cardosinho
 Michelle Birkheuer as Bruna
 Kailany Guimarães as Vitinho/Vítor (Rosana's baby)
 Marília Passos as Patty (Patrícia Gouveia Brandão)
 Alexandra Richter as Rita
 Leonardo Villar as Ronaldo Rosa
 Ítalo Rossi as Juiz Bonifácio
 Tião D'Ávila as Sílvio
 Ana Carbatti as Eneida
 Dill Costa as Raimunda
 Hugo Gross as Detetive Alceu
 Juliana Martins as Ana
 Mário César Camargo as Beraldo
 Paulo Figueiredo as Prefeito Lineu Inácio
 Ricardo Petraglia as Dr. Armando
 Sônia Guedes as Madalena
 Fernanda de Freitas as Heloísa
 Ana Paula Botelho as Bia
 Cacá Bueno as Horácio
 Jana Palma as Luciana
 Xando Graça as Delegado Isolino Furtado
 Ramon Francisco as Zé
 Nathália França as Carol Rosa

Supporting cast 
 Adalberto Nunes as Miguel
 Alexandre Zacchia as driver
 Aline Borges as Dolores (Amelinha's employee)
 Amandha Lee as Laura
 Ana Roberta Gualda as student
 Bia Nunnes as Dra. Selma (Lipe's psychologist)
 Bruno Abrahão as Lipe's colleague
 Bruno Gradim as Maurício (Lolô's groom)
 Cláudia Lira as Matilde
 Cléa Simões as Naná (Lipe's nanny)
 Dorgíval Jr. as Rodrigo
 Erom Cordeiro as student
 Eunice Silva as Dona Alair (secretary of the university)
 Fausto Maule as Buddy Holliday
 Fernanda de Freitas as Lolô (Heloísa Cordeiro)
 Gilberto Marmorosch as Fernetto's innkeeper
 Heitor Martinez as Cláudio (Clara's friend)
 Jaime Leibovitch as João Mourão's lawyer
 Lucas Margutti as student
 Luciana Rigueira as Vanderléia
 Luiz Felipe Badin as Osvaldo (bearer of the down syndrome)
 Malu Valle as Eliane (Rafaela's mother)
 Marcelo Escorel as Joaquim  Mendes
 Marcos França as forum official
 Marcos Palmeira as Júlio Rosa
 Maria Cristina Gatti as Andréia (social assistant)
 Marilu Bueno as Madame Nicete
 Marly Bueno as Zuzú (mother-in-law Pedro)
 Mauro José as Padre Saulo
 Miguel Rômulo as André
 Monique Lafond as Amelinha's medical
 Murilo Elbas as apparitor
 Nica Bonfim as João Mourão's nurse
 Nildo Parente as Dr. Carrasco (Mariana's lawyer)
 Orã Figueiredo as Marido de Mercedes
 Plínio Soares - Antônio (Rafaela's father)
 Roberto Frota as entrepreneur
 Rodrigo Edelstein as student
 Roger Gobeth as Zeca Estrela (Zé Coutinho)
 Rosaly Papadopol as Fábio's mother
 Rosane Gofman
 Tadeu di Pietro as entrepreneur

References

External links 
  

2002 telenovelas
Brazilian telenovelas
2002 Brazilian television series debuts
2002 Brazilian television series endings
TV Globo telenovelas
Portuguese-language telenovelas